St. Sava Serbian Orthodox School is located in the suburb of Kilkenny in Adelaide, Australia. On the same land there is a hall for concerts when Serbian singers come to Adelaide, a bar, half a basketball court for kids to have a friendly game and there is also a church. The name of the whole complex is named after the Serbian saint, Saint Sava.

Eastern Orthodox schools in Australia
Serbian Orthodox Church in Australia
Private schools in Adelaide
High schools in South Australia
Serbian-Australian culture
Serbian schools outside Serbia